Murutinga do Sul is a municipality in the state of São Paulo in Brazil. The population is 4,506 (2020 est.) in an area of 251 km². The elevation is 409 m.

References

Municipalities in São Paulo (state)